Silence Is Sexy is the eighth full-length studio album from the German experimental band Einstürzende Neubauten and was released in 2000.

Track listing 
 “Sabrina” (4:39)
 “Silence Is sexy” (7:00)
 “In Circles” (2:30)
 “Newtons Gravitätlichkeit” ("Newton's Gravi-agitation") (2:01)
 “Zampano” (5:40)
 “Heaven is of Honey” (3:54)
 “Beauty” (1:59)
 “Die Befindlichkeit des Landes” ("The Lay of the Land") (5:43)
 “Sonnenbarke” ("Sun Ship") (7:49)
 “Musentango” ("Muse Tango") (2:13)
 “Alles (Ein Stück im alten Stil)” ("Everything (A Piece in the Old Style)")(4:43)
 “Redukt” (10:17)
 “Dingsaller” (5:46)
 “Total Eclipse of the Sun” (3:52)

The German release replaces “Total Eclipse of the Sun” with “Anrufe in Abwesenheit” ("Missed Calls"). A limited edition of the album included a bonus disc featuring the 18-minute-long “Pelikanol.”

Personnel
Einstürzende Neubauten
 Jochen Arbeit
 Blixa Bargeld
 Alexander Hacke
 Rudolph Moser
 N.U. Unruh

References

2000 albums
Einstürzende Neubauten albums
Mute Records albums